Charles Emmanuel Bénézit (Jersey, 1854 – Paris, 1920) was a French gallery owner, collector, art historian and editor of the Benezit Dictionary of Artists.

Biography
Bénézit was born on Jersey, where his father, musician Charles Bénézit, was exiled. The Channel Islands census records Charles and Euphrasie Bénézit "born in France" and Emmanuel's older sisters already being on the island before Hugo in the 1851 census, and still there after Hugo in the 1871 census. The census records five sisters; Caroline 1842, Marie 1846, Ursule 1948, Adele 1850, Berthe 1859.

His son Emmanuel-Charles Bénézit (1887–1975) was a painter and art curator. Marguerite Bénézit was his daughter.

References

1854 births
1920 deaths
French art dealers
Art collectors from Paris
Jersey people